Land Transport New Zealand was a Crown entity in New Zealand, tasked with promoting safe and functional transport by land, and includes responsibilities such as driver and vehicle licensing. It was created on 1 December 2004 by the Land Transport Management Amendment Act 2004, was the successor entity to the disestablished Land Transport Safety Authority and Transfund New Zealand, and was disestablished from 31 July 2008, merging with Transit New Zealand to become the NZ Transport Agency.

References

External links
 Official website

New Zealand Crown entities
Transport authorities in New Zealand